Abu'l Hasan Ahmad ibn Ibrahim Al-Uqlidisi was a Muslim Arab  mathematician, who was active in Damascus and Baghdad. He wrote the earliest surviving book on the positional use of the Arabic numerals, Kitab al-Fusul fi al-Hisab al-Hindi (The Arithmetics of India) around 952. It is especially notable for its treatment of decimal fractions, and that it showed how to carry out calculations without deletions.

While the Persian mathematician Jamshīd al-Kāshī claimed to have discovered decimal fractions himself in the 15th century, J. Lennart Berggren notes that he was mistaken, as decimal fractions were first used five centuries before him by al-Uqlidisi as early as the 10th century.

A. S. Saidan who studied al-Uqlidisi's mathematical treatise in detail wrote:
The most remarkable idea in this work is that of decimal fraction. Al-Uqlidisi uses decimal fractions as such, appreciates the importance of a decimal sign, and suggests a good one. Not al-Kashi (d. 1436/7) who treated decimal fractions in his "Miftah al-Hisab", but al-Uqlidisi, who lived five centuries earlier, is the first Muslim mathematician so far known to write about decimal fractions.

Notes

References
 

10th-century Arabs
10th-century mathematicians
Medieval Syrian mathematicians
People from Damascus
10th-century Syrian people